Valencene synthase (EC 4.2.3.73) is an enzyme with systematic name (2E,6E)-farnesyl-diphosphate diphosphate-lyase (valencene-forming). It is a terpene cyclase enzyme responsible for the biosynthesis of valencene, a sesquiterpene, using farnesyl pyrophosphate as its substrate.  The first such enzyme was isolated using orange cDNA.
This enzyme catalyses the following chemical reaction

 (2E,6E)-farnesyl diphosphate  (+)-valencene + diphosphate

The recombinant enzyme from Vitis vinifera forms (+)-valencene and (-)-7-epi-α-selinene.

References

External links 
 

EC 4.2.3